{{DISPLAYTITLE:C27H32O14}}
The molecular formula C27H32O14 (molar mass: 580.54 g/mol, exact mass: 580.1792 u) may refer to:

 Naringin
 Narirutin